David or Dave Hosking may refer to:

 Dave Hosking, member of the Australian indie rock-folk music band Boy & Bear
 David Hosking (cricketer) (born 1941), New Zealand cricketer
 David Hosking (rower), British lightweight rower